John Halsey may refer to:
John Halsey (privateer), colonial American privateer and later pirate
John Halsey (musician), rock drummer
Sir John Walter Brooke Halsey, 4th Baronet of the Halsey baronets

See also
Halsey (disambiguation)